Anthony Galvin (born 12 July 1956) is a former professional footballer who played as a winger. He played most successfully with Tottenham Hotspur, for whom he played 201 league games. He finished his league career with spells at Sheffield Wednesday and Swindon Town. Born in England, he played for the Republic of Ireland, winning 29 caps including 3 in Euro 88.

Club career

Tottenham Hotspur
Galvin was born in Huddersfield, West Riding of Yorkshire, England. He was bought by Tottenham Hotspur manager Keith Burkinshaw in 1978 from Northern Premier League side Goole Town on the recommendation of Tottenham's double winning manager Bill Nicholson. On 3 February 1979, he made his debut in the 3–0 home defeat to Manchester City highlights of which was shown on The Big Match. His first goal coming at the Baseball Ground against Derby County. Around 1981 he became a regular with his strength in wing play being that he was difficult to knock off the ball and was able to put in accurate crosses. He was a member of the successful Spurs side of the early 80s, winning two successive FA Cups in 1981 & 1982, and also the UEFA Cup in 1984. In all he played 273 first team games and scored 31 goals including a hat trick against Southampton in May 1986.

Sheffield Wednesday
He was sold by new Spurs manager David Pleat to Sheffield Wednesday in 1987, but his spell at Wednesday was hit by injury.

Swindon Town
Galvin tried to make a fresh start at Swindon Town, where he was signed by former Spurs teammate Ossie Ardiles in 1989. He stayed as a player for the rest of the season where Swindon reached the Division 2 play-offs. He then went on to become Ardiles' assistant, before following him to Newcastle United where he took a similar position until Ardiles was sacked in 1992.

International career
Galvin won 29 caps for the Republic of Ireland, despite playing for England schools. He made his debut for Ireland in the European Championships qualifier against The Netherlands in Rotterdam on 22 September 1982 and scored his only goal away to Luxembourg in a Euro 88 qualifier. He was named by Jack Charlton in Ireland's first ever finals squad at Euro 88, and started all 3 games against England, USSR and the Netherlands. Galvin was able to understand the USSR's tactical calls during a game in Euro 88 because he had a degree in Russian.

Outside of football
Before joining Spurs, Galvin gained a degree in Russian Studies at Hull University. He also studied teaching as a postgraduate at Trent Polytechnic. After his football career ended he returned to education teaching at a London College.

Honours

As a player
Tottenham
 FA Cup: 1981, 1982
 FA Charity Shield: 1981
 UEFA Cup: 1984

See also
 List of Republic of Ireland international footballers born outside the Republic of Ireland

References

External links

Tony Galvin – Republic of Ireland International Footballer – Football-Heroes.net
Tony Galvin – Galvin-ised
 Sunday Times article 21 February 2010

1956 births
Living people
Footballers from Huddersfield
English footballers
England schools international footballers
English people of Irish descent
Republic of Ireland association footballers
Republic of Ireland international footballers
UEFA Euro 1988 players
Goole Town F.C. players
Tottenham Hotspur F.C. players
Sheffield Wednesday F.C. players
Swindon Town F.C. players
English Football League players
Alumni of the University of Hull
Alumni of Nottingham Trent University
UEFA Cup winning players
Royston Town F.C. managers
Newcastle United F.C. non-playing staff
Swindon Town F.C. non-playing staff
Association football wingers
FA Cup Final players